Kevin Yagher (born June 23, 1962) is an American special effects technician, known for Freddy Krueger's makeup and The Crypt Keeper creature.

Career
His company, Kevin Yagher Productions, has created effects for A Nightmare on Elm Street 2: Freddy's Revenge, A Nightmare on Elm Street 3: Dream Warriors, A Nightmare on Elm Street 4: The Dream Master, Face/Off, Enemy of the State, Volcano, Starship Troopers, Conspiracy Theory, Radio Flyer, Mission: Impossible 2, and Honey, I Blew Up the Kid. Yagher's other credits include Tales from the Crypt, and Child's Play, where he met his wife, Catherine Hicks.

He is the designer and executor of the Chucky doll. Yagher frequently collaborated with puppeteer Brock Winkless on his productions. For example, Winkless performed the puppetry for Chucky in Child's Play and several of its sequels. Yagher and Winkless also worked closely on the visual effects of Honey, I Blew Up the Kid (1992).

Yagher directed Hellraiser: Bloodline, but decided to be credited as Alan Smithee after Dimension Films re-edited the film. He heads Kevin Yagher Productions, Inc.

Yagher has worked with "Weird Al" Yankovic on a number of occasions. In 1988, Yagher created a fat suit and appliance makeup for Yankovic's "Fat" video, which Yankovic later wore in his concerts while performing the song. A year later, Yagher created prosthetics that gave Yankovic a hypermuscular upper body when parodying Rambo in his film UHF.

Personal life
He was married to actress Catherine Hicks on May 19, 1990. The two have a daughter, Caitlin, who was born in 1992. He has two brothers: actor Jeff Yagher and special makeup effects artist Chris Yagher.

Filmography

Special makeup effects artist

The Spiderwick Chronicles (2008)
Æon Flux (2005)
Lemony Snicket's A Series of Unfortunate Events (2004)
13 Going on 30 (2004)
Cradle 2 the Grave (2003)
Adaptation (2002)
The Master of Disguise (2002)
Windtalkers (2002)
Blow  (2001)
Mission: Impossible 2 (2000)
Sleepy Hollow (1999)
Conspiracy Theory (1997)
Face/Off (1997)
Bordello of Blood (1996)
The Fan (1996)
The Dentist (1996)
Rumpelstiltskin (1996)
Hellraiser: Bloodline (1996)
Dr. Jekyll and Ms. Hyde (1995)
Children of the Corn III: Urban Harvest (1995)
Honey, I Blew Up the Kid (1992)
Article 99 (1992)
Glory (1989)
The Phantom of the Opera (1989)
Bill & Ted's Excellent Adventure (1989)
Freddy's Nightmares (1988)
A Nightmare on Elm Street 4: The Dream Master (1988)
Child's Play (1988)
The Seventh Sign (1988)
Cherry 2000 (1987)
The Hidden (1987)
A Nightmare on Elm Street 3: Dream Warriors (1987)
Trick or Treat (1986)
A Nightmare on Elm Street Part 2: Freddy's Revenge (1985)
Friday the 13th: The Final Chapter (1984)
Bones (2005-2017)
Bill & Ted Face the Music (2020)
Bill & Ted's Bogus Journey (1991)
Child's Play 2 (1990)
Child's Play 3  (1991)
Bride Of Chucky (1998)
Tales From The Crypt (1989-1996)
Starship Troopers (1997)
Ghosted (2017)
Rizzoli & Isles (2010-2016)
The finder (2012)
Xtreme Fakeovers (2005)
The Hulk (2003)
The Cat In The Hat (2003)
Anger Management (2003)
The Matrix Reloaded (2003)
The Matrix Revolutions (2003)
In Dreams (1999)
The Astronaut's Wife (1999)
Enemy Of The State (1998)
Getting Even With Dad (1994)
Man's Best Friend (1993)
Defenseless (1991)
The Borrower (1991)
Meet the Applegates  (1990)
The Seventh Sign (1988)
Aerosmith Pink Video (1997)

References

External links
 
 

1962 births
Living people
American make-up artists
Special effects people
Film directors from Illinois
People from Decatur, Illinois